A society of apostolic life is a group of men or women within the Catholic Church who have come together for a specific purpose and live fraternally. It is regarded as a form of consecrated (or "religious") life.  

There are a number of apostolic societies, such as the Daughters of Charity of Saint Vincent de Paul, who make vows or other bonds defined in their constitutions to undertake to live the evangelical counsels of poverty, chastity, and obedience (See Can. 731 §2.). However, unlike members of an institute of consecrated life (religious institute or secular institute), members of apostolic societies do not make religious vows—that is, "public vows".

This type of organization is defined in the 1983 Code of Canon Law under canons 731–746. Under the 1917 Code of Canon Law, which preceded the current one, this manner of life was referred to as a society of common life.

Background

While members of apostolic societies have some community life, the mission of the community is given emphasis. According to Robert P. Maloney CM, community life should be strong enough to be supportive to those who have pledged to pursue the same apostolic purpose, and flexible enough to allow members to respond to the urgent needs of those they serve. In community, apostolic societies must maintain a balance between prayer and active works.

The work of various apostolic societies differs significantly from one another. They may focus on preaching, teaching, health-care, seminary education, foreign missions, retreat work, advocacy for justice, and many other objectives. Almost all apostolic societies had their origins in a need to be addressed that their founders recognized. Most apostolic societies focus on one or more aspects of the corporal and spiritual works of mercy. Vincent de Paul's, Congregation of the Mission and the Daughters of Charity belong to a group of societies founded in the 16th and 17th century to respond to increasing poverty in France. De Paul chose not to establish the Daughters of Charity of St. Vincent de Paul as a religious order, as at that time, women religious were "enclosed" (cloistered), and that state was "not compatible with the duties of their vocation".

A community needs the written approval of a bishop to operate within his diocese. Clerics of a society of apostolic life are usually incardinated into the society and not the diocese, unless specified otherwise in its constitution (e.g. the Sulpicians who are members of both the Society and diocese). Each community has a right to its own oratory.

Members of a Society of apostolic life are allowed to own personal property, but must normally live in community with one another.

Canon law (canon 731) speaks of such societies as being "comparable to institutes of consecrated life". They are regulated by the Congregation for Institutes of Consecrated Life and Societies of Apostolic Life.

List

Society of Apostolic Life of Pontifical Right 
A society of apostolic right can be approved by the Pope.

For men
 Catholic Foreign Mission Society of America, M.M. (Maryknoll Fathers)
 Clerical Society of the Missionaries of the Holy Apostles, M.S.A.
 Clerical Society of Virgo Flos Carmeli, E.P.
 Companions of the Cross, C.C.
 Confederation of Oratories of Saint Philip Neri, C.O. (Oratory of Saint Philip Neri, Oratorians)
 Congregation of Jesus and Mary, C.I.M./C.J.M. (Eudists)
 Congregation of the Mission, C.M. (Vincentians, Lazarists)
 Glenmary Home Missioners, G.H.M.
 Guadelupe Home Missioners, M.G.
 Heralds of Good News, H.G.N.
 Institute of Christ the King Sovereign Priest I.C.R.S.S.
 Institute of the Good Shepherd
 Lay Consecrated Men Regnum Christi
 Mission Society of the Philippines, M.S.P.
 Missionaries of Africa, M.Afr. (White Fathers)
 Missionaries of the Holy Cross, M.S.C.
 Missionaries of the Precious Blood, C.PP.S.
 Missionary Society of Saint Columban, S.S.C.M.E. (Columban Missionaries)
 Oratory of France, C.O.I. (Oratorians of France)
 Paris Foreign Missions Society, M.E.P.
 Paulist Fathers, C.S.P.
 Pontifical Institute for Foreign Missions, P.I.M.E.
 Portuguese Missionary Society, S.M.P. / S.M.B.N.
 Priestly Fraternity of St. Peter, F.S.S.P.
 Priestly Fraternity of the Missionaries of St.Charles Borromeo, F.S.C.B.
 Saint Francis Xavier Spanish Institute for Foreign Missions, I.E.M.E.
 Saint Joseph’s Missionary Society of Mill Hill, M.H.M.
 Saint Patrick’s Society for the Foreign Missions, S.P.S.
 Scarboro Foreign Mission Society, S.F.M.
 Society of African Missions, S.M.A.
 Society of Bethlehem Mission Immensee, S.M.B.
 Society of Foreign Missions: Société des Missions-Étrangères du Québec, P.M.E.
 Society of Priests of Saint James, P.S.J.
 Society of Priests of Saint Joseph Benedict Cottolengo, S.S.C.
 Society of Priests of Saint Sulpice, P.S.S., Society of Saint-Sulpice (Sulpicians)
 Society of Saint Joseph of the Sacred Heart, S.S.J. (Josephites - which has a homonym) 
 Society of the Catholic Apostolate, S.A.C. (Pallottines)
 Society of the Missionaries of Saint Francis Xavier, S.F.X. (Pilar Fathers)
 Sodalitium Christianae Vitae (Sodalitium of Christian Life), S.C.V.
 Vincentian Congregation, C.V.
 Workers of the Kingdom of Christ, C.O.R.C.
 Yarumal Society for the Foreign Missions, M.X.Y. / I.M.E.Y.

For women

Consecrated Women of Regnum Christi
 Daughters of Charity of St. Vincent de Paul
 Sisters of Social Service

Society of Apostolic Life of Diocesan Right 
The diocesan bishop must consent to the "erection of a house and establishment of a local community", and must also be consulted concerning its suppression.

 Apostolic Life Community of Priests in the Opus Spiritus Sancti, A.L.C.P./O.S.S. (Holy Spirit Fathers)
 Companions of the Cross, C.C.
 Missionaries of Our Lady of the Most Blessed Sacrament, S.D.N.
 Missionary Society of Saint Paul of Nigeria, M.S.P.
 Missionary Society of St. Thomas the Apostle, M.S.T.
 Oblates of Saints Ambrose and Charles, O.Ss.C.A.
 Oblates of Saints Charles and Gaudentius of Novara, O.Ss.G.C.N.
 Society of Saint John Mary Vianney, S.J.M.V. (has a Personal Ordinariate; devoted to the Tridentine use)
 Society of Our Lady of the Most Holy Trinity
 Work of the Holy Spirit, O.S.S.

See also 

 Institutes of consecrated life
 Religious institute (Catholic)
 Vocational discernment in the Catholic Church

Notes

External links
 GigaCatolic list with individual links
 
The Congregation for Institutes of Consecrated Life and Societies of apostolic Life

 
Organisation of Catholic religious orders